The Rideau Ferry Yacht Club Conservation Area or Rideau Ferry Conservation Area was established along a  shoreline property on the Lower Rideau Lake. The former Rideau Ferry Yacht Club donated the property in 1976 to provide a public recreation area with access to the lake.

References 

Conservation areas in Ontario